Neberte nám princeznú is a modern version of the Snow White and the Seven Dwarfs fairytale, starring Marika Gombitová. The musical was directed by Martin Hoffmeister, and released in 1981.

Synopsis

Girl Katka (Marika Gombitová) is frustrated and restless. She escapes from home and finds herself in the orphanage. Seven orphan boys hide her and call her "Princess". But Katka is soon uncovered and her frantic mother is on the way.

Credits
 Martin Hoffmeister - screenplay
 Alta Vášová - libretto
 Rudolf Milič - cinematography

Cast
 Marika Gombitová as Katka
 Miroslav Žbirka as Katka's boyfriend
 Marie Rottrová as Katka's mother
 Luděk Sobota as Katka's father
 Petr Nárožný as director of orphanage
 Mária Hájková as cleaner
 Jozef Vrábel as orphan boy
 Michal Vrábel as orphan boy
 Matúš Cinzer as orphan boy
 Roman Haša as orphan boy
 Ján Kovačič as orphan boy
 Ľudovít Tóth as orphan boy
 Daniel Hassan as orphan boy
 Viera Hladká as teacher
 Hana Talpová
 Jan Kanyza as police officer (VB)

Soundtrack

Neberte nám princeznú is the original picture soundtrack released on BMG on 19 November 2001.

Track listing

Official releases
 2001: Neberte nám princeznú, CD, BMG, #74321 90447
 2004: Neberte nám princeznú, DVD, Dikrama, #0014 9331

Credits and personnel
 Dežo Ursiny - music, guitar, chorus
 Ján Štrasser - lyrics
 Marika Gombitová - lead vocal
 Miroslav Žbirka - lead vocal
 Marie Rottrová - lead vocal
 Pavel Daněk - bass, chorus
 Martin Karvaš - keyboards
 Ľubomír Stankovský - drums, percussion, chorus

Charts

Year-end charts

Sales certifications

ČNS IFPI
In Slovakia, the International Federation of the Phonographic Industry for the Czech Republic (ČNS IFPI) awards artists since the cancellation of the Slovak national section (SNS IFPI). Currently, there are awarded Gold (for 3,000 units), and/or Platinum certifications (for 6,000 units), exclusively for album releases. Gombitová demonstrably won at least seven platinum, and three golden awards in total.

See also
 Marika Gombitová discography
 Marika Gombitová awards
 The 100 Greatest Slovak Albums of All Time

References

General

Specific

External links 
 

1981 films
Films based on Snow White
Czechoslovak musical films
Czech musical films